Qomik-e Bozorg (also Romanized as Qomīk-e Bozorg; also known as Qomīk and Qom Yek) is a village in Qaqazan-e Sharqi Rural District, in the Central District of Takestan County, Qazvin Province, Iran. At the 2006 census, its population was 1,097, in 243 families.

References 

Populated places in Takestan County